Wierzbica  is a village in Chełm County, Lublin Voivodeship, in eastern Poland. It is the seat of the gmina (administrative district) called Gmina Wierzbica.

The village has a population of 310.

References

Villages in Chełm County